Le Jaguar is a 1996 French film directed by Francis Veber starring Jean Reno, Patrick Bruel, Harrison Lowe, and Patricia Velásquez. A shaman from the South American rain forest visits Paris for a public relations campaign along with a French ethnologist. When the shaman's soul is apparently stolen, he enlists the help of a good-for-nothing named Perrin, with whom he spontaneously created a spiritual link.

Plot 

François Perrin is a gambler, anxious to escape the thugs who pursue him after he reneged on a bet. He stumbled upon Jean Campana, a French ethnologist and environmentalist who was raised in the Amazon jungle and his companion Wanu, a shaman who has left his remote home to help Campana campaign on the rain forest's behalf in Paris. When Wanu suddenly tweaks Perrin's nose and proclaims him to be the "chosen one", Perrin is naturally surprised. He is more surprised when Wanu shows up in his lavish apartment that same night, drugs him and covers him with ritual markings, thereby creating a magical link between them. The next day Wanu suffers a heart attack that he interprets as the theft of his soul. He beckons Perrin to him and insists that he go to the jungle with Campana to find his soul, which has taken the form of a jaguar. Unfortunately for Perrin, the dense jungle proves to be far more dangerous than any gambler's henchmen and comical chaos ensues as he struggles to survive.

Cast 
 Jean Reno	as Jean Campana
 Patrick Bruel as François Perrin
 Harrison Lowe as Wanù
 Patricia Velásquez as Maya
 Danny Trejo as Kumare
 Gil Birmingham as guard of Kumare
 Roland Blanche as Moulin
 François Perrot as Matelako
 Francis Lemaire as Stevens
 Jacques Curry as Olivier

External links
 
 

1990s adventure comedy films
1996 films
Films directed by Francis Veber
Films with screenplays by Francis Veber
Films set in Venezuela
Films shot in Venezuela
French comedy films
1990s French-language films
1996 comedy films
1990s French films